The arrondissement of Carcassonne is an arrondissement of France in the Aude department in the Occitanie région. Its INSEE code is 111 and its capital city is Carcassonne. It has 186 communes.

It is the northernmost of the arrondissements of the department. The main cities in the arrondissement are Carcassonne (47,068 inhabitants in 2012), Castelnaudary (11,748 inhabitants) and Trèbes (5,280 inhabitants).

Geography
The arrondissement of Carcassonne occupies the northwestern part of the department and is bordered to the north by the Tarn department, to the northeast by the Hérault department, to the east by the arrondissement of Narbonne, to the southwest by the arrondissement of Limoux, to the west by the Ariège department and to the northwest by the Haute-Garonne department.

Composition

The communes of the arrondissement of Carcassonne, and their INSEE codes, are:

 Aigues-Vives (11001)
 Airoux (11002)
 Alairac (11005)
 Alzonne (11009)
 Aragon (11011)
 Arquettes-en-Val (11016)
 Arzens (11018)
 Azille (11022)
 Badens (11023)
 Bagnoles (11025)
 Baraigne (11026)
 Barbaira (11027)
 Belflou (11030)
 Belpech (11033)
 Berriac (11037)
 Blomac (11042)
 Bouilhonnac (11043)
 Bram (11049)
 Brézilhac (11051)
 Brousses-et-Villaret (11052)
 Les Brunels (11054)
 Cabrespine (11056)
 Cahuzac (11057)
 Capendu (11068)
 Carcassonne (11069)
 Carlipa (11070)
 La Cassaigne (11072)
 Les Cassés (11074)
 Castans (11075)
 Castelnaudary (11076)
 Caudebronde (11079)
 Caunes-Minervois (11081)
 Caunettes-en-Val (11083)
 Caux-et-Sauzens (11084)
 Cavanac (11085)
 Cazalrenoux (11087)
 Cazilhac (11088)
 Cenne-Monestiés (11089)
 Citou (11092)
 Comigne (11095)
 Conques-sur-Orbiel (11099)
 Couffoulens (11102)
 Cumiès (11114)
 Cuxac-Cabardès (11115)
 Douzens (11122)
 Fajac-en-Val (11133)
 Fajac-la-Relenque (11134)
 Fanjeaux (11136)
 Fendeille (11138)
 Fenouillet-du-Razès (11139)
 Ferran (11141)
 Floure (11146)
 Fonters-du-Razès (11149)
 Fontiers-Cabardès (11150)
 Fontiès-d'Aude (11151)
 La Force (11153)
 Fournes-Cabardès (11154)
 Fraisse-Cabardès (11156)
 Gaja-la-Selve (11159)
 Generville (11162)
 Gourvieille (11166)
 Hounoux (11173)
 Les Ilhes (11174)
 Issel (11175)
 Labastide-d'Anjou (11178)
 Labastide-en-Val (11179)
 Labastide-Esparbairenque (11180)
 Labécède-Lauragais (11181)
 Lacombe (11182)
 Lafage (11184)
 Laprade (11189)
 Lasbordes (11192)
 Lasserre-de-Prouille (11193)
 Lastours (11194)
 Laurabuc (11195)
 Laurac (11196)
 Laure-Minervois (11198)
 Lavalette (11199)
 Lespinassière (11200)
 Leuc (11201)
 Limousis (11205)
 La Louvière-Lauragais (11208)
 Malves-en-Minervois (11215)
 Marquein (11218)
 Marseillette (11220)
 Les Martys (11221)
 Mas-Cabardès (11222)
 Mas-des-Cours (11223)
 Mas-Saintes-Puelles (11225)
 Mayreville (11226)
 Mayronnes (11227)
 Mézerville (11231)
 Miraval-Cabardes (11232)
 Mireval-Lauragais (11234)
 Molandier (11236)
 Molleville (11238)
 Montauriol (11239)
 Montclar (11242)
 Montferrand (11243)
 Montirat (11248)
 Montmaur (11252)
 Montolieu (11253)
 Montréal (11254)
 Monze (11257)
 Moussoulens (11259)
 Orsans (11268)
 Palaja (11272)
 Payra-sur-l'Hers (11275)
 Pécharic-et-le-Py (11277)
 Pech-Luna (11278)
 Pennautier (11279)
 Pépieux (11280)
 Pexiora (11281)
 Peyrefitte-sur-l'Hers (11283)
 Peyrens (11284)
 Peyriac-Minervois (11286)
 Pezens (11288)
 Plaigne (11290)
 Plavilla (11291)
 La Pomarède (11292)
 Pradelles-Cabardès (11297)
 Preixan (11299)
 Puginier (11300)
 Puichéric (11301)
 Raissac-sur-Lampy (11308)
 La Redorte (11190)
 Ribouisse (11312)
 Ricaud (11313)
 Rieux-en-Val (11314)
 Rieux-Minervois (11315)
 Roquefère (11319)
 Rouffiac-d'Aude (11325)
 Roullens (11327)
 Rustiques (11330)
 Saint-Amans (11331)
 Saint-Denis (11339)
 Sainte-Camelle (11334)
 Sainte-Eulalie (11340)
 Saint-Frichoux (11342)
 Saint-Gaudéric (11343)
 Saint-Julien-de-Briola (11348)
 Saint-Martin-Lalande (11356)
 Saint-Martin-le-Vieil (11357)
 Saint-Michel-de-Lanès (11359)
 Saint-Papoul (11361)
 Saint-Paulet (11362)
 Saint-Sernin (11365)
 Saissac (11367)
 Sallèles-Cabardès (11368)
 Salles-sur-l'Hers (11371)
 Salsigne (11372)
 Serviès-en-Val (11378)
 Souilhanels (11382)
 Souilhe (11383)
 Soupex (11385)
 Taurize (11387)
 La Tourette-Cabardès (11391)
 Trassanel (11395)
 Trausse (11396)
 Trèbes (11397)
 Tréville (11399)
 Val-de-Dagne (11251)
 Ventenac-Cabardès (11404)
 Verdun-en-Lauragais (11407)
 Verzeille (11408)
 Villalier (11410)
 Villanière (11411)
 Villardonnel (11413)
 Villar-en-Val (11414)
 Villarzel-Cabardès (11416)
 Villasavary (11418)
 Villautou (11419)
 Villedubert (11422)
 Villefloure (11423)
 Villegailhenc (11425)
 Villegly (11426)
 Villemagne (11428)
 Villemoustaussou (11429)
 Villeneuve-la-Comptal (11430)
 Villeneuve-lès-Montréal (11432)
 Villeneuve-Minervois (11433)
 Villepinte (11434)
 Villesèquelande (11437)
 Villesiscle (11438)
 Villespy (11439)
 Villetritouls (11440)

History

The arrondissement of Carcassonne was created in 1800. At the January 2017 reorganization of the arrondissements of Aude, it lost 27 communes to the arrondissement of Narbonne, and it gained seven communes from the arrondissement of Limoux.

As a result of the reorganisation of the cantons of France which came into effect in 2015, the borders of the cantons are no longer related to the borders of the arrondissements. The cantons of the arrondissement of Carcassonne were, as of January 2015:

 Alzonne
 Belpech
 Capendu
 Carcassonne-1
 Carcassonne-2-Nord
 Carcassonne-2-Sud
 Carcassonne-3
 Castelnaudary-Nord
 Castelnaudary-Sud
 Fanjeaux
 Lagrasse
 Mas-Cabardès
 Montréal
 Mouthoumet
 Peyriac-Minervois
 Saissac
 Salles-sur-l'Hers

References

Carcassonne
Carcassonne